Kidarakulam is a village in Alangulam Taluk in Tenkasi district, Tamil Nadu, India. It is located 25 km to the Esat of District headquarters Tenkasi. 8 km from Alangulam. Postal head office is Nettur

Geography
It is situated at an average elevation of 111 metres.

Demographics
 India census, Kidarakulam had a population of around 2,009 as per the 2001 census. Males constitute 45% of the population and females 65%. Kidarakulam has an average literacy rate of 69%, higher than the national average of 59.5%; with 59% of the males and 41% of females literate. 10% of the population is under 6 years of age.

Economy
The area has a number of people involved agriculture.  The place is noted for the self-employed beedi workers here.  Most of the women are involved in beedi making.  Alangulam which is  also known as small town for supplying Vegetable's throughout South India. Alangulam Vegetable market trading 24x7 supplies. People are working in windmills too. Agriculture plays a major role in Kidarakulam.

Utilities and facilities

Transport
Kidarakulam is well connected by main roads to Alangulam (8 km) located in south, to SankaranKovil (30 km) located in north and to Surandai (19 km) located in west. Bus facilities also available for nearest places such as Alangulam, Veeranam, Surandai, Nalloor, SankaranKovil, Aladipatti, Nettur, and Nallur.

Education
Literacy rate in Kidarakulam is over 69%.

Schools
The schools in the location are
 N.M.M. Middle School, Kidarakulam
 Government High School, Veeranam. (2 km from Kidarakulam)
 Hindu Higher Secondary School, MayamaanKurichi (2 km from Kidarakulam).
 West Tirunelveli Higher Secondary School,Nallur. (8 km from Kidarakulam)
 St.Joseph Matriculation Higher Secondary school, Alangulam.
 Sri Ramakrishna Matriculation higher secondary school, Alangulam.
 Government higher secondary school, Alangulam.
 St.Joseph matriculation school, Alangulam.

Colleges
 CSI Jayaraj Annapackiam College, Nallur., Alangulam Taluk.
 Sardar Raja College of Engineering.
 Einstein college of Engineering.
 Aladi Aruna College of Nursing, Sivalarkulam.
 St. Mariam Polytechnic College, Sivalarkulam.
 Sri Muppidathi Amman College of education, Adaikalapatinam.
 St.Johns Teacher Training Institution, Maranthai.
 Diwan ITI, Maranthai.

Adjacent communities 
Veeranam (2 km), Kadanganeri (3 km), Nettur (1 km), Naranapuram (3 km), Thuthikulam (4 km), Ayyanarkulam (4 km) are the nearby villages to Kidarakulam. Kidarakulam is surrounded by Surandai Taluk to the west, Keelapavoor Taluk to the west, Kadayam Taluk to the west, Pappakudi Taluk to the south.

References

Cities and towns in Tirunelveli district